The True South Geographical Union is the Geographical Union (GU) for rugby union teams playing in the Southern United States for USA Rugby.

True South Rugby Football Union is responsible for governing the following Local Area Unions (LAU's):
 Deep South Rugby Football Union (DSRFU)
 MidSouth Rugby Football Union (MSRFU)

See also
 USA Rugby
 Rugby union in the United States

References

External links

USA Rugby Official Site
IRB Official Site

Rugby union governing bodies in the United States